Lutjewinkel is a village in the Dutch province of North Holland.

The village was first mentioned in 1680 as Lutke Winckel, and means "little Winkel". It was founded as a daughter settlement of Winkel.

Lutjewinkel was home to 171 people in 1840. It is best known for its 1906 cheese factory. It is one of the largest dairy factories and is nowadays owned by FrieslandCampina.

Gallery

References

Populated places in North Holland
Hollands Kroon